Sir Lindsay Lindsay-Hogg, 1st Baronet (10 March 1853 – 25 November 1923) was a British horse breeder and Member of Parliament for Eastbourne from 1900 to 1906.

Life
Born Lindsay Hogg, he assumed the additional name of Lindsay before that of Hogg by Royal Licence 6 January 1906.

Lindsay-Hogg was elected as Member of Parliament (MP) for Eastbourne at the 1900 general election, and held the seat until his defeat at the 1906 general election, after which he did not stand for Parliament again. He was awarded a baronetcy for his services to breeding light horses on 22 December 1905. He lived at Rotherfield Hall in the Weald, Sussex. He was also president of Crufts.

Family
He married Alice Margaret Emma Cowley and had four children: twins William (1882–1918) and Alice (1882–1965), Edith (1889–1912), Cecily (b. 1898). He was succeeded by his son William's two sons, Anthony (1908–68), who became the second baronet on his grandfather's death in 1923, and Edward (1910–99), who became the fourth baronet in 1987 after the death of his brother Anthony's son William (1930–87), the third baronet.

Lady Lindsay-Hogg was attended in her old age by society doctor and suspected serial killer John Bodkin Adams, who signed her death certificate as "Scirrhus carcinoma of the breast" when she died aged 96 on 23 August 1952. Her name came up during the 1956 investigation into Adams' methods, when nurse Gertrude Brady, who looked after Lady Lindsay-Hogg in 1950–1951, told police how she had been asked by Anthony Lindsay-Hogg to help get Lady Lindsay-Hogg's signature for a legal document. Brady had been worried by this since in her view Lady Lindsay-Hogg was "senile" and "confused". Adams witnessed Lady Lindsay-Hogg's signature and must "have known this as well". Adams was later tried for the murder of Edith Alice Morrell in 1957 but acquitted, though police suspected him of a total of 163 murders.

See also
Lindsay-Hogg Baronets

References

External links 
 
Country Life photograph of Rotherfield Hall in 1909

Baronets in the Baronetage of the United Kingdom
Conservative Party (UK) MPs for English constituencies
UK MPs 1900–1906
1853 births
1923 deaths
British racehorse owners and breeders